Comhairle na Poblachta was an Irish republican organisation established in 1929.

The organisation had the support of the IRA, which had agreed to its formation at its General Army Convention in January 1929. The IRA envisaged it as a co-ordinating body of anti-Treaty republican forces and its membership was drawn from Sinn Féin, Comhairle na dTeachtaí (consisting of the remaining anti-Treaty members of the Second Dáil), the IRA, Cumann na mBan and left-wing republicans.

According to leading member Mary MacSwiney, the Comhairle sought "agreement and co-operation between the civil and military arms of the Republic". Other prominent members included Margaret Buckley, Maud Gonne, Count Plunkett, Frank Ryan, Peadar O'Donnell, Brian O'Higgins, and Mick Fitzpatrick. A weekly newspaper, An Phoblacht, was issued. Apart from their shared hostility to the Cumann na nGaedheal government, the party's members had little in common.

The Comhairle was not successful in its aims.

References

1929 establishments in Ireland
Irish Republican Army (1922–1969)
Irish republican organisations